Volume 7, Between the Devil and the Deep Blue Sea is the seventh full-length album by The Generators. Released in 2009 by People Like You/Concrete Jungle in Europe and Japan. Recorded throughout March and May 2009 at The Mouse House in Altadena, Ca. by Rich Mouser.  The first Generator's full-length without original drummer Dirty Ernie Berru and the last to feature original guitarist and songwriter Sir Doosky. The band brought in Derek O'Brien of Social Distortion fame to fill in on drums.

Track listing
All songs by Dagger/Doosky unless otherwise noted.

 "The Devil's Lament" (Dagger/Doosky/Mouser)
 "Sound Off the Alarms"
 "Every Waking Moment" (Dagger/Lutz/Doosky)
 "Smoke and Mirrors"
 "Day of Reckoning"
 "World's Apart"
 "Same Old Day"
 "Southern Nights" (Dagger/Danny Damned)
 "Somewhere In the Rain"
 "Trainwreck"
 "Right Beside You" (Dagger/Danny Damned)
 "Lonely Boulevard" (Dagger/Doosky/Danny Damned)

Credits
Doug Dagger – lead vocals
Sir Doosky – lead and rhythm guitars, backing vocals
Ace Von Johnson - rhythm guitar on "Sound Off the Alarms", "Smoke and Mirrors", "Day of Reckoning", and "Trainwreck"
Brandon Lutz - bass, backing vocals
Derek O'Brien – drums

Additional musicians 
Rich Mouser – Hammond Organ, backing vocals and additional guitars on "World's Apart",  "Southern Nights", and "The Devil's Lament"
 Danny Damned - piano on "Sound Off the Alarms", "World's Apart", "Southern Nights", and "Right Beside You"

The Generators albums
2009 albums